The 2015 Washington Huskies football team represented the University of Washington in the 2015 NCAA Division I FBS football season.   The team was led by second-year head coach was Chris Petersen.  Washington was a member of the North Division of the Pac-12 Conference and played their home games on campus at Alaska Airlines Field at Husky Stadium, in the University District of Seattle. They finished the season 7–6, 4–5 in Pac-12 play to finish in a tie fourth place in the North Division. They were invited to the Heart of Dallas Bowl where they defeated Southern Miss.

Previous season
The Huskies finished the season 8–6, 4–5 in Pac-12 play to finish in third place in the North Division. They were invited to the Cactus Bowl where they lost to Oklahoma State.

Personnel

Coaching staff
Source:

Roster

Recruiting class

Schedule

Game summaries

at Boise State

Sacramento State

Utah State

California

at USC

Oregon

at Stanford

Arizona

Utah

at Arizona State

at Oregon State

Washington State

vs. Southern Miss (Heart of Dallas Bowl)

Postseason

2016 NFL Draft

The 2016 NFL Draft was held at Auditorium Theatre in Chicago on April 28 through April 30, 2016. The following Washington players were either selected or signed as free agents following the draft.

References

Washington
Washington Huskies football seasons
First Responder Bowl champion seasons
Washington Huskies football